Vince Gamad (born January 15, 1994) is a Filipino actor, model and host. He is a host in Walang Tulugan with the Master Showman; hosts German Moreno, Sanya Lopez, Jak Roberto, Teejay Marquez and Hiro Peralta.

Career
Gamad started his career and worked on GMA Network. He signed a contract in GMA Artist Center. In 2012 Gamad appeared as a host of Walang Tulugan with the Master Showman;  in 2015 Gamad appeared in a GMA TV series Let the Love Begin as Erick's friend; in 2016 he portrayed Glenn on Juan Happy Love Story.

Filmography

Television

References

External links
 

1994 births
Living people
Filipino male television actors
Male actors from Metro Manila

GMA Network personalities